Argyris is a Greek surname, which means silver. Notable people with the surname include:

 Angelos Argyris (born 1994),  Greek footballer
 Chris Argyris
 Giannis Argyris
 John Argyris

See also
Argyris, a synonym of the moth genus Problepsis

Surnames of Greek origin